Salmon Gums is a small town in Western Australia located 106 km north of Esperance on the Coolgardie-Esperance Highway. The name is derived from a prominent stretch of Eucalyptus salmonophloia (Salmon Gum) trees which formed a landmark in the town's early days. The town is part of the Shire of Esperance. At the 2016 census, Salmon Gums had a population of 191.

The surrounding areas produce wheat and other cereal crops. The town is a receival site for Cooperative Bulk Handling.

History
The first potential use of a townsite was as a watering spot for the proposed Esperance to Norseman Railway, since Salmon Gums is roughly halfway between these two towns. Land for a town-site was set aside in 1912 and the name was recommended in 1916. This land lay within the tribal boundaries of the indigenous Kalaako. The town was gazetted in 1925, when the Esperance to Salmon Gums section of the railway was completed.

Settlement of the area received a boost after the First World War when returning soldiers were given grants of land  in this and many other areas around the state. These grantees became known as soldier settlers. At the time Salmon Gums was regarded as being on the fringe of arable land. The low soil fertility and marginal average rainfall meant that yields were poor prior to the 1950s. As a result, the land was not in high demand, so the opportunity cost to the government was quite small.

Agricultural research was boosted prior to the Second World War by the establishment of the Salmon Gums Research Station. In 1949 a similar station, the Esperance Downs Research Station was established near Esperance. Research at the latter quickly led to the discovery that soil in the Esperance region was deficient in trace elements, reportedly phosphorus, copper and zinc, and the addition of these greatly improved fertility and crop yields. Since then the region, including Salmon Gums, has become a successful producer of wheat, sheep and cattle.

Mining
In 2001 a Perth-based iron ore company announced an investigation into a large lignite deposit at Salmon Gums for use reducing its phosphorus-rich iron ore currently being mined at Koolyanobbing. As of 2009 all plans for the mining of the lignite has been suspended indefinitely due to the stock market collapse in early 2009. The sudden drop in oil prices would make the refinement of the oil  suspended in the lignite financially unviable.

Climate
Salmon Gums has a mild semi-arid climate (Köppen BSk). According to both the Köppen and Trewartha classifications for humid climates it is thermally subtropical, the months of January and February exceeding  and all months exceeding  on average, though by the Köppen criteria for arid climates and the classification used by the Australian Bureau of Meteorology its yearly average (being less than ) is insufficient to qualify as such.

An average of 70 days per year reach or exceed , putting it within American Horticultural Society heat zone 7.

Precipitation is relatively evenly distributed throughout the year, but is dramatically more erratic and heavier per event on average in the summer than in the winter.

References

Towns in Western Australia
Goldfields-Esperance
Grain receival points of Western Australia